Kelley Few is a former England women's international footballer. Few's greatest achievement was scoring the winning goal in the 1998 FA Women's Cup Final with Arsenal.

Honours
Arsenal
 FA Women's Cup: 1992–93, 1994–95, 1997–98

References

Living people
Women's association football defenders
Arsenal W.F.C. players
FA Women's National League players
English women's footballers
England women's international footballers
Year of birth missing (living people)